J D Simo is an American guitarist, singer-songwriter, producer, solo artist and former member of the rock band SIMO.

Biography
As a guitarist, songwriter and producer/engineer, Simo has worked with the Jack White (Beyoncé Lemonade sessions), Phil Lesh, Luther Dickinson, Cowboy Jack Clement, Dave Cobb, Chris Isaak and Baz Luhrmann on the soundtrack to his forthcoming Elvis biopic.

He was a member of the psychedelic rock band SIMO from 2012-2018. 
He has released four solo albums to date. 
He resides in Nashville with his wife and daughter.

Discography
Off at 11 (2019)
JD Simo (2020)
Mind Control (2021)
Songs from the House of Grease (2023)

with SIMO:
SIMO (2011) (album)
Let Love Show The Way (2016) (album)
Rise & Shine (2017)

References

External links
 Official website
 Official blog

1980s births
Living people
American blues guitarists
American male guitarists
American blues singer-songwriters
Blues musicians from Illinois
Singer-songwriters from Illinois
Guitarists from Illinois
21st-century American male singers
21st-century American singers
21st-century American guitarists
American male singer-songwriters